This is a list of English-medium schools in Bangladesh. The most commonly used syllabus are the Pearson Edexcel and Cambridge Assessment International Education. Other syllabus are also used, albeit rarely.

Dhaka 
akmis (abdul kadir molla international school)

Other divisions

English-medium